Iván Persa (April 2, 1861 – September 26, 1935) was a Hungarian Slovene Roman Catholic priest and writer.

Born in the Municipality of Beltinci in the village of Ižakovci, his parents were the farmers István Persa and Mária Kolár. He was ordained on July 14, 1885. Between 1885 and 1887 he served as a curate in Grad, here found to Association of Jesus's Heart. From 1887 to 1894, after in 1894–1913 he was a  priest in Alsószölnök and Felsőszölnök, near Szentgotthárd. Here also found to associations and in 1898 wrote scapulare in the Prekmurje dialect titled Od vnouge i velke miloscse i pomoucsi szvétoga skapulera.

By 1913 he was a priest in Pečarovci at St. Sebastian's Church. He died there in 1935.

External links 
 Vasi digitális könyvtár – Vasi egyházmegye

See also 
 List of Slovene writers and poets in Hungary

1861 births
1935 deaths
People from the Municipality of Beltinci
19th-century Slovenian Roman Catholic priests
Slovenian writers and poets in Hungary
Slovenian writers
20th-century Slovenian Roman Catholic priests